LaQuan Smith (born August 30, 1988) is a luxury fashion designer and founder of womenswear clothing brand LaQuan Smith, LLC. Smith serves as chief executive officer and is based in New York City.

Early life
Smith was born on August 30, 1988, in Queens, New York. As he grew up, he developed a passion for fashion and design. He further developed his passion at the age of 13 when his grandmother passed on her old Singer sewing machine for him to use. From there,  he began regularly designing and creating garments. In 2007, he graduated from Glasgow High School in Delaware. Shortly after he began his career in fashion.

Career
In 2005, Smith applied to the Fashion Institute of Technology, as well as Parsons School of Design, but was not accepted. Smith then began interning at the New York magazine BlackBook in 2007, working for celebrity fashion stylist Elizabeth Sulcer. He would attend events by pretending to be a BlackBook editor. In 2008, he created his self-titled designer brand. 

In February 2010, he made his New York Fashion Week debut at the Society of Illustrators headquarters in Upper East Side. The audience for Smith's 'Water Goddess' show included fashion press, buyers, and celebrities. Specifically, the Vogue editor-at-large Andre Leon Talley, Vogue style director Alexandra Kotur, Janice Combs, Misa Hylton, Justin Tranter , and lawyer L. Londell McMillan. He later presented a Spring-Summer Collection in September 2010.

Smith's collection for the 2011 New York Fashion Week was showcased in the Gramercy Ballroom at the Peninsula Hotel. The collection, titled 'A Story Book Path', was inspired by Marie Antoinette, Cruella De Vil, and Queen Elizabeth I. Notable guests included Andre Leon Talley, Diane von Furstenberg, George Malkemus, Sandra Bernhard, Lorenzo Martone, Marcus Samuelsson, and L. Londell McMillan. Models walking in the show included Cassie Ventura, Deborah Cox, Jaslene Gonzalez, Serena Williams, Rihanna, Kim Kardashian, Nicki Minaj, and Christina Milian.

For the February 2022 New York Fashion Week, Smith paid tribute to his mentor, Andre Leon Talley, by showcasing a glamour-styled event. The show featured Julia Fox and exhibited models wearing high-heels, red sequined dresses, faux fur corsets, cut-out frocks, gold leggings, miniskirts, and Lurex.

References

External links
 

Living people
1988 births
African-American fashion designers
21st-century African-American people
20th-century African-American people